The Touring club de France (1890-1983) was a French social club devoted to travel, founded by enthusiasts of the velocipede. Its headquarters sat on the Avenue de la Grande Armée in Paris.

History
The idea of the Touring club de France was inspired by the British Cyclists' Touring Club, founded in 1873 and also devoted to cyclism, and promoted in France under the impulse of Paul de Vivie.

The archives of the Touring club de France were given in 1984 to the French National Archives (number 53 AS).

Prize
The Touring club de France used to award several prizes to support mountain guides fathers of large families. The Jean S. Barès Prize was awarded to mountain guides from the Pyrénées, living above an altitude of 500 meters and raising at least seven children, all born at that altitude or above. The recipient of that prize in 1928 was Pierre Mayneris, a mountain guide from Baillestavy, near the Canigou, who received 2400 francs as a support to raise his nine children. The Brunier Prize was the equivalent for mountain guides living in the French Alps above an altitude of 1000 meters.

See also
Tourism in France
Touring Club Suisse

References

Bibliography

 
 

Issued by the club
  (ongoing monthly magazine)
  1900-1906 (33 vols.)

External links

Efficient Travel Tips
Split Croatia Travel Guide

Clubs and societies in France
Organizations established in 1890
Organizations disestablished in 1983
Tourism in France
Organizations based in Paris